USS Shrewsbury (SP-70) was an armed motorboat that served in the United States Navy as a patrol vessel from 1917 to 1919.

Shrewsbury was built in 1910 by George Lawley & Son at Neponset, Massachusetts, as the private motorboat Mona. In private use, she subsequently was renamed Gipsy (according to one source), then Topsy. She had been renamed Shrewsbury by the time the U.S. Navy acquired her from her owner, N. H. McCarter of Newark, New Jersey, on 13 April 1917 for World War I service. She was commissioned as USS Shrewsbury (SP-70) on 23 April 1917.

Shrewsbury patrolled in the 4th Naval District along the central United States East Coast during World War I.

Stricken from the Navy List on 16 September 1919, Shrewsbury was sold on 20 October 1919 or 29 October 1919 to Charles S. McCulloh of New York City.

Notes

References

Department of the Navy: Naval Historical Center: Online Library of Selected Images: U.S. Navy Ships: USS Shrewsbury (SP-70), 1917-1919. Originally the Civilian Motor Boat Mona, Topsy and Shrewsbury
NavSource Online: Section Patrol Craft Photo Archive Shrewsbury (SP 70)

Patrol vessels of the United States Navy
World War I patrol vessels of the United States
Ships built in Boston
1910 ships